Eugene Coughlan (born 18 November 1956 in Clareen, County Offaly) is a retired Irish hurler. He played for his local club Seir Kieran and was a member of the Offaly senior inter-county team from 1977 until 1990.  Coughlan is regarded as one of Offaly's greatest-ever players.

References

Teams

1956 births
Living people
Seir Kieran hurlers
Offaly inter-county hurlers